The 22809 / 10 Paradeep–Visakhapatnam Express is a Express train belonging to Indian Railways East Coast Railway zone that runs between  and  in India.

It operates as train number 22809  from Paradeep to Visakhapatnam and as train number 22810 in the reverse direction, serving the states of Odisha & Andhra Pradesh.

Coaches
The 22809 / 10 Paradeep–Visakhapatnam Express has one AC 2 tier, three AC 3 tier, seven sleeper coaches, six general unreserved & two SLR (seating with luggage rake) coaches . It does not carry a pantry car.

As is customary with most train services in India, coach composition may be amended at the discretion of Indian Railways depending on demand.

Service

Schedule
22809 – Starts from Paradeep every Wednesday at 22:55 IST and reaches Vishakapatnama next day morning 08:20 AM

22810 – Starts from Vishakapatnama every Sundayat 23:50 IST and reaches Paradeep next day morning 09:10 AM IST

Routing

Traction
As the route is electrified, a Visakhapatnam-based WAP-4 electric locomotive pulls the train to its destination.

Reverse

Rake composition

 1 AC II Tier
 3 AC III Tier
 7 Sleeper coaches
 6 General
 2 Second-class Luggage/parcel van

References

External links
22809  Paradeep–Visakhapatnam Express at India Rail Info
22810 Visakhapatnam–Paradeep Express at India Rail Info

Express trains in India
Transport in Paradeep
Rail transport in Odisha
Rail transport in Andhra Pradesh
Transport in Visakhapatnam